Pelham School District (School Administrative Unit #28) is a school district headquartered in Pelham, New Hampshire, in the United States.

School board
The Pelham School Board contains five members each serving a three-year term as of election day.

The 2020 School Board members are (Term expiration)

 Megan Larson, Chair (2021)

 Deb Ryan, Vice Chair (2021)
 Darlene Greenwood (2023)
 Troy Bressette (2022)
 G. David Wilkerson (2022)
 School Board Representative
 Joe Wholey
 School District Treasurer
 Patricia Murphy
 School District Clerk
 Danielle Pilato
 School District Moderator
 Doug Viger
 School Board Secretary
 Matthew Sullivan

Schools
 Pelham High School
 Pelham Memorial School
 Pelham Elementary School

References

External links
 

School districts in New Hampshire
Education in Hillsborough County, New Hampshire
Pelham, New Hampshire